Bezirk Feldbach is a former district of the state of Styria in Austria. Feldbach merged with the district of Radkersburg to form the new district Südoststeiermark on January 1, 2013.

Municipalities
Towns (Städte) are indicated in boldface; market towns (Marktgemeinden) in italics; suburbs, hamlets and other subdivisions of a municipality are indicated in small characters.
 Auersbach
 Wetzelsdorf
 Aug-Radisch
 Aug, Radisch
 Bad Gleichenberg
 Gleichenberg Dorf, Klausen
 Bairisch Kölldorf
 Baumgarten bei Gnas
 Badenbrunn, Wörth
 Breitenfeld an der Rittschein
 Neustift bei Breitenfeld, Sankt Kind
 Edelsbach bei Feldbach
 Kaag, Rohr an der Raab
 Edelstauden
 Eichkögl
 Erbersdorf, Mitterfladnitz
 Fehring
 Burgfeld, Höflach, Petersdorf, Petzelsdorf, Schiefer
 Feldbach
 Fladnitz im Raabtal
 Frannach
 Manning, Oberlabill
 Frutten-Gießelsdorf
 Frutten, Gießelsdorf, Hochstraden
 Glojach
 Gnas
 Burgfried, Fischa, Höf, Obergnas, Pernreith
 Gniebing-Weißenbach
 Gniebing, Oberweißenbach, Paurach, Unterweißenbach
 Gossendorf
 Edersgraben, Höflach
 Grabersdorf
 Hatzendorf
 Habegg, Oedgraben, Stang bei Hatzendorf, Tiefenbach, Unterhatzendorf
 Hohenbrugg-Weinberg
 Hohenbrugg an der Raab, Weinberg an der Raab
 Jagerberg
 Grasdorf, Hamet, Jahrbach, Lugitsch, Oberzirknitz, Pöllau, Ungerdorf, Unterzirknitz, Wetzelsdorf bei Jagerberg
 Johnsdorf-Brunn
 Brunn, Johnsdorf
 Kapfenstein
 Gutendorf, Haselbach, Kölldorf, Mahrensdorf, Neustift, Pichla
 Kirchbach in Steiermark
 Glatzau, Kleinfrannach, Maierhofen, Tagensdorf, Ziprein
 Kirchberg an der Raab
 Berndorf, Hof, Wörth bei Kirchberg an der Raab
 Kohlberg
 Kornberg bei Riegersburg
 Bergl, Dörfl, Edelsgraben, Oberkornbach, Schützing
 Krusdorf
 Grub
 Leitersdorf im Raabtal
 Lödersdorf
 Lödersdorf I, Lödersdorf II
 Maierdorf
 Hirsdorf, Katzelsdorf, Kinsdorf, Ludersdorf
 Merkendorf
 Haag, Steinbach, Waldsberg, Wilhelmsdorf
 Mitterlabill
 Unterlabill
 Mühldorf bei Feldbach
 Obergiem, Oedt bei Feldbach, Petersdorf, Reiting, Untergiem
 Oberdorf am Hochegg
 Radersdorf, Tiefernitz
 Oberstorcha
 Reith, Unterstorcha
 Paldau
 Axbach, Häusla, Pöllau, Puch, Saaz
 Perlsdorf
 Pertlstein
 Petersdorf
 Pirching am Traubenberg
 Guggitzgraben, Kittenbach, Oberdorf, Rettenbach in Oststeiermark
 Poppendorf
 Ebersdorf, Katzendorf
 Raabau
 Raning
 Thien
 Riegersburg
 Altenmarkt bei Riegersburg, Grub, Krennach, Lembach bei Riegersburg, Schweinz
 Sankt Anna am Aigen
 Sichauf, Aigen, Jamm, Klapping, Plesch, Risola, Waltra
 Sankt Stefan im Rosental
 Aschau, Dollrath, Frauenbach, Gigging, Höllgrund, Krottendorf im Saßtal, Lichendorf, Lichtenegg, Pölzengraben, Reichersdorf, Tagensdorf, Trössengraben
 Schwarzau im Schwarzautal
 Maggau, Seibuttendorf
 Stainz bei Straden
 Dirnbach, Karbach, Muggendorf, Sulzbach
 Studenzen
 Siegersdorf
 Trautmannsdorf in Oststeiermark
 Hofstätten, Trautmannsdorf in Oststeiermark
 Unterauersbach
 Glatzental, Oberauersbach
 Unterlamm
 Magland, Oberlamm
 Zerlach
 Breitenbuch, Dörfla, Kittenbach, Maxendorf, Weißenbach

States and territories disestablished in 2013